The Disaster Relief Act of 1974 (Public Law 93-288) was passed into law by the then President Richard Nixon as a United States federal law that established the process of presidential disaster declarations. The bill was introduced by Senator Quentin Burdick on February 26, 1974. The bill passed 91-0 as amended on April 10, 1974 and the House agreed to conference report by a vote of 392–0 on May 15, 1974. It was to better handle the array of disasters that occur annually throughout the 50 states. At one point, more than one hundred federal agencies were involved in handling disasters and emergencies. The Act also helped give more fixed relief to disaster survivors.

Amendments
In 1979, President Jimmy Carter consolidated many of them into the new Federal Emergency Management Agency (FEMA) by Executive Order 12127.

In November 1988, the United States Congress amended the Act and renamed it the Stafford Disaster Relief and Emergency Assistance Act (Public Law 100-707).

This act was further amended by the Disaster Mitigation Act of 2000.

References

1974 in law
93rd United States Congress
United States federal emergency management legislation